Hills is a city in Rock County, Minnesota,  United States.  Located  approximately four miles (6 km) from the South Dakota border and two miles (3 km) from the Iowa border, it is the southwesternmost city in Minnesota. The population was 686 at the 2010 census.

Geography
The landscape is flat with some gently rolling hills; however, the town's name does not derive from a particular topographical feature. The town includes one park, Jacobson Park.

Demographics

2010 census
As of the census of 2010, there were 686 people, 263 households, and 171 families residing in the city. The racial makeup of the city was 98.0% White, 0.4% African American, 0.1% Asian, 0.1% Pacific Islander, 0.3% from other races, and 1.0% from two or more races. Hispanic or Latino of any race were 1.0% of the population.

There were 263 households, of which 32.3% had children under the age of 18 living with them, 54.0% were married couples living together, 6.5% had a female householder with no husband present, 4.6% had a male householder with no wife present, and 35.0% were non-families. 29.7% of all households were made up of individuals, and 17.5% had someone living alone who was 65 years of age or older. The average household size was 2.43 and the average family size was 2.95.

The median age in the city was 41.5 years. 24.5% of residents were under the age of 18; 5.8% were between the ages of 18 and 24; 22.7% were from 25 to 44; 21.7% were from 45 to 64; and 25.4% were 65 years of age or older. The gender makeup of the city was 48.0% male and 52.0% female.

2000 census
As of the census of 2000, there were 565 people, 230 households, and 149 families residing in the city. The racial makeup of the city was 99.29% White, 0.18% African American, 0.18% Asian, 0.18% Pacific Islander, and 0.18% from two or more races. Hispanic or Latino of any race were 0.35% of the population.

There were 230 households, out of which 27.0% had children under the age of 18 living with them, 55.2% were married couples living together, 7.4% had a female householder with no husband present, and 34.8% were non-families. 33.0% of all households were made up of individuals, and 19.6% had someone living alone who was 65 years of age or older.  The average household size was 2.23 and the average family size was 2.81.

In the city, the population was spread out, with 20.5% under the age of 18, 6.7% from 18 to 24, 22.1% from 25 to 44, 21.8% from 45 to 64, and 28.8% who were 65 years of age or older.  The median age was 46 years. For every 100 females, there were 87.7 males.  For every 100 females age 18 and over, there were 82.5 males.

The median income for a household in the city was $33,125, and the median income for a family was $43,750. Males had a median income of $30,000 versus $21,833 for females. The per capita income for the city was $15,824.  About 2.8% of families and 5.6% of the population were below the poverty line, including 3.1% of those under age 18 and 11.6% of those age 65 or over.

History
Hills was platted in 1889, and named for Frederick C. Hills, a railroad official. A post office has been in operation at Hills since 1890. Hills was incorporated in 1904.

Agriculture
The local economy is largely dependent upon agriculture; corn and soybeans are the region's primary cash crops.

Education
The Hills school system consolidated with the Beaver Creek school system in the 1960s, when it became Hills-Beaver Creek (H-BC).  The high school, which houses grades 7-12, is located in Hills; the elementary school, with grades K-6, is located in Beaver Creek.  There were 294 students enrolled in grades K-12 in 2005.

Politics
Hills is located in Minnesota's 1st congressional district, represented by Mankato educator Jim Hagedorn, a Republican. At the state level, Hills is located in Senate District 22, represented by Republican Bill Weber, and in House District 22A, represented by Republican Joe Schomacker.

References

External links
 City of Hills

Cities in Minnesota
Cities in Rock County, Minnesota